Sydir Artemovych Kovpak, (June 7, 1887December 11, 1967) was one of the partisan leaders of the Soviet partisans in Ukraine during the World War II.

Biography
Kovpak was born to a poor Ukrainian peasant family in Kotelva village in Kharkov Governorate, Russian Empire (in present-day Ukraine). For his military service in World War I, he was awarded two Crosses of St. George personally by the Emperor Nicholas II of Russia (an award for exceptional military heroism). After the Russian Revolution he joined the All-Russian Communist Party (Bolsheviks) and fought for the Red Army partisan units against the German forces, as well as against Denikin's White Army in a Vasily Chapayev's cavalry division. In the interwar period he was a head of the local government in the town of Putyvl, Sumy Oblast (province).

World War II

At the time of the German invasion of Soviet Ukraine partisan units led by Sydir Kovpak waged guerrilla warfare against Axis forces originally in partisan strongholds in  Sumy and Bryansk regions but later its operation spread deep into German-occupied territory including Kyiv, Zhytomyr, Rivne, Homyel, Volyn and other regions. These partisan units also fought against the nationalist Ukrainian Insurgent Army. In 1944 partisans under Kovpak's leadership raided enemy forces throughout western Ukraine and Belarus and even reached Romanian border regions during the Carpathian raid inflicting heavy casualties on the Germans.

Kovpak mastered guerrilla tactics and was awarded Hero of the Soviet Union title twice (1942; 1944). In the summer of 1943 Germans managed to hunt down and kill Kovpak's second in command Semyon Rudnev who was replaced by a new right-hand man Petro Vershigora who would later become a writer and dedicate his books to Kovpak's underground resistance.

Sydir Kovpak was promoted to the rank of Major General in 1943. According to the memoirs of his lieutenant Vershigora, his promotion and General's stars were airdropped to his partisan unit's position deep behind the front lines. After the end of the Second World War Sydir Kovpak held key positions in the leadership of Soviet Ukraine, including Vice Chairman of the Supreme Court of Ukraine in 1947 and Supreme Council of Ukraine in 1967. He also was a member of the Supreme Soviet of the Soviet Union for the 2nd through 7th convocations.

Books
 От Путивля до Карпат (From Putivl to the Carpathian Mountains), 1945, Voenizdat, 136 pages. Recorded by Evgenii Nikolaevich Gerasimov (1903-1986). English translation Vid Putivla do Karpat published by Politvydav Ukrainy, Kyiv, first print in 1973.
 Из дневника партизанских походов (From the diary of partisan marches), 1964, DOSAAF, Russian language, 220 pages.
 Воспоминания, очерки, статьи (Memoirs, essays, articles), 1987, Politvydav Ukrainy, Kyiv, Russian language, 388 pages.

Movies
Kovpak was portrayed (by Konstantin Stepankov) in Soviet film trilogy Duma o Kovpake (Дума о Ковпаке, Poem of Kovpak): 
 Duma o Kovpake: Nabat (Дума о Ковпаке: Набат, Poem of Kovpak: Alarm), 1973 – how initially small partisan unit of twelve people grew into large force under Kovpak and Rudnev.
 Duma o Kovpake: Buran (Дума о Ковпаке: Буран, Poem of Kovpak: Storm), 1975 – about actions in enemy rear in 1941–1942.
 Duma o Kovpake: Karpaty, Karpaty... (Дума о Ковпаке: Карпаты, Карпаты..., Poem of Kovpak: Carpathians, Carpathians...), 1976 – about the 1943 raid into the Carpathians.

A TV documentary Его звали ДЕД (He was called GRANDPA) (Ukrainian language, produced by TRK Era, director Oleksiy Barbaruk-Trypilsky, 36 min, screened in 2011) documents Kovpak's life during the war.

See also
One of the branches of Kovpak formation was at Torforazrabotki, in vicinity of Deptovka, Dmitrievka rayon, Chernigov oblast. This branch was a medical camp located deep in the woods of Chernigov oblast. The branch was hiding wounded partisans, caring for them until they could be evacuated to Bolshaya Zemlya by aircraft (U2). The commander of the camp was Naum Aronovich, which before the war was the director of Sovkhoz in Deptovka. The Doctor was Natalia Buseva, Feldsher was Claudia Buseva, several nurses from former Deptovka hospital. The camp functioned for 2.5 years until retreat of German troops in 1943.

References

 "How Sydir Kovpak was a guerilla before the war",  Zerkalo Nedeli, (the Mirror Weekly), Kiev, August 11–17, 2001. in Russian, in Ukrainian.
 People with clear conscience — Memoires of Pyotr Petrovich Vershigora

External links

1887 births
1967 deaths
People from Poltava Oblast
People from Kharkov Governorate
Russian military personnel of World War I
Bolsheviks
Soviet military personnel of the Russian Civil War
Second convocation members of the Supreme Soviet of the Soviet Union
Third convocation members of the Supreme Soviet of the Soviet Union
Fourth convocation members of the Supreme Soviet of the Soviet Union
Fifth convocation members of the Supreme Soviet of the Soviet Union
Sixth convocation members of the Supreme Soviet of the Soviet Union
Seventh convocation members of the Supreme Soviet of the Soviet Union
Soviet major generals
Soviet partisans in Ukraine
Ukrainian people of World War I
Ukrainian people of World War II
Heroes of the Soviet Union
Recipients of the Order of Lenin
Recipients of the Order of the Red Banner
Recipients of the Order of Suvorov, 1st class
Recipients of the Order of Bogdan Khmelnitsky (Soviet Union), 1st class
Recipients of the Cross of St. George
Recipients of the Medal of St. George
Burials at Baikove Cemetery
Ukrainian anti-fascists